, Chinese: 山本稲; pinyin: shan bendao) is a Japanese singer and model whose latest hit song was  in 1973.

Biography

Yamamoto was born March 4, 1951, in Kitakyushu to a Japanese mother and an American father. Her father was a U.S. serviceman who died in the Korean War when she was only two years old. Yamamoto moved to Yokohama as a child. She began modeling when just eleven years old, first becoming known after an appearance in the popular fashion magazine, Soen. She was scouted to become a singer, and in 1966 made her debut single "Komacchauna", which promptly sold over a million copies. Yamamoto continued her modeling career, and as such her modeling career rocketed. A contemporary of Twiggy, she began to be called "the Japanese Twiggy", and the two made some appearances together. About a year after her debut, Yamamoto did a six show tour of the United States, which included stops in New York City and San Francisco. All attempts at a follow-up hit fizzled, however.

She stayed busy with her singing career, however, with some appearances in musicals and on television, but was not getting near the top of the charts. In 1972, she made the first of her numerous comebacks, with the smash hit single "Donimo Tomaranai", which became the second biggest hit of her career. The song was written by the accomplished writing team of Yū Aku and Shunichi Tokora, who also wrote hits for Pink Lady, Finger 5, and Momoe Yamaguchi. They later wrote more songs for Yamamoto, including "Jin Jin Sasete", "Kuruwasetaino", and "Neraiuchi". Yamamoto also had a brief turn as a voice actress in 1974, providing the speaking and singing voice of Princess Margaret in Gisaburo Sugii's anime movie version of Jack and the Beanstalk. She also played the character of Mari in the original Kamen Rider TV series starting in 1971.

However good her songs and singing might have been, what people talked about most was the way she looked. Her stage costume of the time revealed her bellybutton, which became known as "heso dashi". For the times it was considered a very sexy, provocative look, bordering on scandalous, and "heso dashi" became the topic of much media discussion. In the 1970s she began spending a good deal of time doing a stage revue type show, often at famed the Crystal Room in Akasaka. Her shows were consistently popular, and the media began calling her "queen of revue". In 1989 she also started adding chanson to her repertoire, for which she won critical and popular acclaim.

During the 1990s Yamamoto was mostly coasting on her successful past. Even a photo book of nudes only caused a small ripple of new interest. The durable star's career was once again revived, however, this time by a little girl named Chibi Maruko-chan. In her popular anime television program, Maruko-chan would sometimes imitate Yamamoto's songs and dance routines, which again spurred interest, and what finally became another full-fledged Yamamoto revival boom.

In 2001 Yamamoto tied up with the popular Harajuku toy store Kiddyland to make a line of Linda goods. She also married for the first time that year, at the age of 50, to a college professor seven years her senior. In 2005 she became the "image character" for Wanda coffee. Throughout her career, Yamamoto has appeared on Kohaku Uta Gassen five times. Her greatest hit, "Neraiuchi", was featured prominently in episode 48 of Ultraman Taro, used as a brass band version in the anime Ace of Diamond and is one of the songs in the Nintendo DS game Osu! Tatakae! Ouendan.

Filmography

Kōhaku Uta Gassen Appearances

External links 
 Official site
 
 Profile at JMDb 

Japanese female adult models
Japanese women singers
Japanese idols
1951 births
Living people
Japanese people of American descent
People from Kitakyushu
Tenchi Muyo!
Musicians from Fukuoka Prefecture